Eusebian may mean:

of or relating to the Eusebian Canons
of or relating to the historiography and historical philosophy of Eusebius
a follower of Eusebius of Nicomedia